Dilip Thakur is the current MLA for the  Sarkaghat  constituency in the Himachal Pradesh Legislative Assembly. He won the election in Himachal Pradesh Legislative Assembly election in 2022.

Thakur won the election defeating INC candidate Pawan Kumar.

References 

Indian politicians
Himachal Pradesh MLAs 2022–2027
Year of birth missing (living people)
Living people